Dexter Manley is an American commercial and video game voice actor. He has worked on 300 commercials and 25 video games. He worked extensively for Nintendo, providing voices for many Mario and Donkey Kong games; and for Microsoft, Boeing Company, Alaska Airlines, and others. Manley has also lent his voice twice to the Star Fox series, voicing ROB 64 in Star Fox: Assault. He appeared as a host on 2005 SIGGRAPH meeting, where he discussed voice acting topics. He is the president of Tenacious Media, media and marketing company operating in Seattle, Washington, and is also a film actor, usually filming in independent films, and playing 
NFL defensive lineman of 1986
Washington Redskins He was the most valuable player in
1986
Washington, DC Sports Hall of Fame.

Known video game work
Backyard Hockey - Buddy Cheque
Backyard Basketball - Barry DeJay
Kakuto Chojin: Back Alley Brutal - J.D. Stone
Mario & Sonic at the London 2012 Olympic Games – Lakitu
Moonbase Commander - DeWulf
Moop and Dreadly in the Treasure on Bing Bong Island - Moop
Ollo in the Sunny Valley Fair - Wally/Brawny/Farmer Franklin
Saw - Jeff Thomas Ridenhour
SiN Episodes: Emergence - Various
Spy Fox in "Dry Cereal" - Hong Kong Doodle, Weasel Doorman
Star Fox: Assault - ROB 64
Starsiege - Squadmate #5
Super Smash Bros. Brawl - Falco Lombardi, Peppy Hare

Filmography
Cage the Dog - Bobby
Unsung - Bruce
Bloody Mary - Luther
Bullets, Blood & a Fistful of Ca$h - Tommy Two Toes
Son of Terror - Undertaker
Nowhere Man - Mike Jordache
Movie Pizza Love - Martin
Mondo Scooterama - Stooge
Bite Size - Douglas Peatry's Father
The Taken - Chip

References

External links
Official website

Dex Manley at the MobyGames

Year of birth missing (living people)
Living people
American male video game actors
American male voice actors
Nintendo people
Place of birth missing (living people)
American entertainment industry businesspeople